Čeľadice is a village and municipality in the Nitra District in western central Slovakia, in the Nitra Region.

History
In historical records the village was first mentioned in 1113.

Geography
It has a population of about 765 people.

Facilities
The village has a public library a gym and football pitch.

See also
 List of municipalities and towns in Slovakia

References

Genealogical resources

The records for genealogical research are available at the state archive "Statny Archiv in Nitra, Slovakia"

 Roman Catholic church records (births/marriages/deaths): 1739-1896 (parish B)

External links
http://www.statistics.sk/mosmis/eng/run.html
Surnames of living people in Celadice

Villages and municipalities in Nitra District